The Association on American Indian Affairs (originally the American Indian Defense Association) is a nonprofit human rights charity located in Rockville, Maryland. Founded in 1922, it is dedicated to protecting the rights of Native Americans.

History
The Association was created by an amalgamation of several non-profit Indian organizations that emerged in the early 1920s. The Eastern Association on Indian Affairs and the New Mexican Association on American Indian Affairs were the first of the predecessor groups to formally organize in 1922. The EAIA and NMAAI were made up of affluent non-Natives, most of whom owned land in Santa Fe and wanted to protect Pueblo culture. The American Indian Defense Association, headed by John Collier, formed to fight against the Bursum Bill and the Leavitt Bill, both bills seeking to end Pueblo ties to their lands, and outlaw cultural practices. These groups merged in the 1930s and eventually consolidated under the name the Association on American Indian Affairs. Today, the Association has an all-Native Board of Directors and Executive Director. The Association has waged innumerable battles over the years, touching on the material and spiritual well-being of Indians throughout Indian Country.

Association timeline

1922 AAIA is formed

1922 AAIA helps Pueblos protect land and water rights

1945 AAIA helps to establish National Congress of American Indians

1948 First college scholarship awarded

1956 AAIA establishes Field Health Nursing program

1968 AAIA begins effort to prevent Otitis Media on Indian reservations

1968 AAIA works to protect Taos Blue Lake

1971 Alaska Native Claims Settlement Act enacted

1978 Indian Child Welfare Act signed into law

1982 AAIA President Ortiz honored by MacArthur Foundation

1984 Tribal Government Tax Status Act becomes law

1986 Landmark Washington Indian Child Welfare tribal-state agreement signed

1990 Native American Graves Protection and Repatriation Act enacted
 
1991 The Medicine Wheel Coalition for the Protection of Sacred Sites established

1994 Amendments to American Indian Religious Freedom Act approved

1994 Reaffirmation of the Ione Band of Miwok Indians by the federal government

1996 Bighorn Medicine Wheel Historic Preservation plan adopted

1998 First AAIA-sponsored diabetes conference takes place

2000 AAIA expands grants to summer camps

2006 AAIA creates Dakotah-language Scrabble game and hosts first tournament

2007 Dakotah language K-12 curriculum completed

2008 Tribal amendments to Title IV-E Foster Care and Adoption Assistance Act approved in Fostering Connections for Success and Increasing Adoptions Act

Programs
The Association on American Indian Affairs offers undergraduate and graduate scholarships to federally recognized and non-recognized Tribal students. The Association works to protect and ensure appropriate implementation of the Indian Child Welfare Act, which the Association helped to draft and enact in 1978 to protect Indian children at risk of being placed in foster care or for adoption. The Association works with Tribes and traditional Indian religious petitioners in efforts to protect sacred lands such as the Bighorn Medicine Wheel in Wyoming. It works with Tribes to educate Native people about diabetes and health related issues. The Association played a key role in enacting the Native American Graves Protection and Repatriation Act and continues to assist efforts to repatriate human remains, funerary and sacred objects to their tribes. The Association provides funding for youth summer camps with a cultural, language, substance abuse, and health and wellness focus.  The Association works to preserve Native languages, with a particular focus upon the Dakotah language.

Youth

Indian Child Welfare Act

The Indian Child Welfare Act (ICWA) is a federal law that seeks to preserve Native American families and keep American Indian children that must be placed out of the home with American Indian families, whenever possible. The United States Congress passed ICWA in 1978 in response to the alarmingly high number of Indian children being removed from their homes by both public and private agencies. The intent of Congress under ICWA was to "protect the best interests of Indian children and to promote the stability and security of Indian tribes and families" (25 U.S.C. § 1902). ICWA sets federal requirements that apply to state child custody proceedings involving an Indian child who is a member of or eligible for membership in a federally recognized tribe.

Advocacy and research by the Association served as a catalyst for the Act.  AAIA’s first activities involved the representation of Indian parents whose children had been wrongfully removed from them, beginning with a case involving the Devils Lake Sioux Tribe  Later, AAIA conducted a survey of states with large Indian populations in 1969 and again in 1974 which indicated that approximately 25–35 percent of all Indian children are separated from their families and placed in foster homes, adoptive homes, or institutions.   AAIA’s Executive Director was the lead witness at the first hearing on Indian child welfare and worked with Congress to draft the legislation. The Association counted to advocate for the passage of ICWA throughout the 1970s, with AAIA’s Executive Director serving the lead witness at the first hearing on Indian child welfare and working with Congress to draft the legislation.

Since its passage, the Association has continued to protect ICWA and work to ensure appropriate implementation through litigation, advocacy and training. These actions have taken the form of legal participation in the Adoptive Couple v. Baby Girl and Mississippi Band of Choctaw Indians v. Holyfield United States Supreme Court cases, working to develop tribal-state agreements and state legislation in a number of states, and contributing to the ICWA guidebook published by the Native American Rights Fund. In seeking to assist tribes more directly, the Association also created A Survey and Analysis of Tribal-State Indian Child Welfare Act Agreements, Including Promising Practices, which can provide a detailed analysis of current Tribal-State ICWA agreements. These agreements determine the relationship between states and tribes beyond the minimum requirements provided for by ICWA. Without these agreements, important communication between state and tribal officials may not occur, potentially undermining the provisions provided by ICWA and putting Indian child unnecessarily at risk.

Yet, in 2019, ICWA once again came under attack in the Fifth Circuit Court of Appeals via Brackeen v. Bernhardt. In this case, the Association on American Indian Affairs joined 56 Tribal organizations, 325 Indian Nations, 21 state attorneys general, 20 law schools, and 30 child welfare organizations to file an amicus curiae ("friend of the court") brief in support of the Indian Child Welfare Act, drawing attention to the numerous abuses that led to the bill’s passage in the first place. While the Fifth Circuit initially ruled in favor of protecting the Act, on November 7, 2019, the Fifth Circuit Court of Appeals ordered the case to be reheard en banc (heard before all judges of the Fifth Circuit) with oral argument. Following this news, the Association on American Indian Affairs, the Native American Rights Fund, the National Congress of American Indians, and the National Indian Child Welfare Association jointly created the #ProtectICWA campaign and filed a new amicus brief with 486 federally recognized American Indian and Alaska Native Tribes and 55 other Native organizations.

Juvenile Justice 
In recent years, the Association has partnered with the Annie E. Casey Foundation and the Juvenile Detention Alternatives Initiative to create a better understanding of how the juvenile detention centers affect Native youth and to provide recommendations as to how these systems can be altered to provide better results for the young people within them and for society as a whole.

The studies associated with this initiative revealed that in many cases, there was no real system to identify Native youth, and that, in many cases, the youth had to choose to self-identify as Native American in order to have their proper status recorded. This often led to underreporting of the number of Native youths within these systems, since many individuals did not want to alert their home communities to these situations due to feelings of embarrassment or shame. As such, many Juvenile Detention sites were not reaching out to the youth’s affiliated Tribe when they were brought in for an indiscretion. This resulted in many individuals being put through state systems of punishment, instead of the culturally appropriate services offered by their Tribe, many of which have been proven to produce more favorable outcomes than the state’s alternatives.

The Association on American Indian Affairs used the information compiled in this report to create its own recommendations on how to improve this system to protect Native youth from unnecessary and often counterproductive incarceration, reduce trauma amongst Native youth, and lessen rates of recidivism to promote a healthier overall society. These recommendations are as follows:

 "Develop uniform and consistent protocols for identifying Native youth by Tribal affiliation, in collaboration with Tribes, that are not dependent on the youth’s self-identification or a unilateral assessment based on physical characteristics."
 "Develop consistent data points to be collected regarding Native youth that includes Tribal affiliation, and base decision-making on the responsible collection of this data, in collaboration with families and Tribes."
 "Establish notification protocols, in collaboration with Tribes, for informing Tribes when a Native youth enters the juvenile justice system."
 "DAI sites that regularly interact with Native youth populations should receive concentrated education and training to develop a deeper level of understanding about the circumstances, issues and needs of Native youth involved in the juvenile justice system, in partnership with Tribes and Tribal programs. Other JDAI sites should receive basic universal education about Native American youth and opportunities to support those Native youth."
 "States and Tribes should execute Memoranda of Understanding for all child welfare and juvenile justice matters. State court and juvenile justice staff should enter into process-driven agreements with Tribal juvenile justice staff and Tribal courts that include provisions regarding how to transfer Native youth to Tribal courts or to Tribal juvenile justice programs; how to identify Native youth; and how to access applicable programming and funding that supports Tribal cultures and traditions."
 "Explore the availability of relevant cultural programs and detention alternatives based on Tribal juvenile justice programs, as well as Tribal traditions and practices."

Since the publication of this document, the Association has worked to increase awareness and create a dialogue between Tribes, states, and localities on the efficacy of juvenile detention policies and ways they may be improved.

Scholarships
The Association began offering scholarships to Native American students attending undergraduate and graduate institutions in 1947. These students must be members of a tribal nation in the United States, regardless of whether the tribe is federally recognized. These scholarships are meant to support Native Americans who are strongly connected to their Tribal Nation and Indian Country, regardless of how long they have been in college or their age.

The Association continued sought to expand this program in the 1950s by establishing an Education Committee and a subcommittee called the Scholarship Committee which held its first meeting in October 1955.  In more recent years, the American Indian College Fund joined forces with the Association on American Indian Affairs to provide administration to the Association’s longstanding scholarship program.

Summer Camps
The Association on American Indian Affairs provides funding for summer camps that work to connect Native youth with cultural experiences, while also teaching on a variety of subjects that relate to physical and emotional wellbeing. Self-care and self-advocacy, suicide prevention, and Native American and Tribal history are among the most common subjects taught in these programs. Between the years 2003 and 2019, the Association granted $212,395 to 136 camps.

This funding first became available from the Association in 1963 as a way to protect indigenous sovereignty, preserve culture, and educate Native children. The hope of this program is that these children will grow up to have a better physical and mental standard of health and will be more culturally and politically connected to their Tribe and to Indian Country as a whole.

Cultural and community preservation

Native language preservation
AAIA Native Language Preservation program produces materials in the Dakotah language for use in preschools, daycares and schools and by families for language learning in the home. Because there are few fluent Dakota speakers left and most are elders over the age of 55, there is a strong need for language preservation. Younger people may have the ability to understand certain phrases or sing Dakota songs but lack the proficiency to keep the language alive for the next generation. AAIA materials include books, MS PowerPoint presentations, DVDs, CDs, and an animation piece that was nominated for Best Animation at the Native Voices Film Festival.

In 2005, with the permission of Hasbro, AAIA created an official Dakota version of Scrabble, including a 207-page dictionary for use with the game. It has sponsored Dakotah-language Scrabble tournaments and made the games available to schools throughout Dakotah communities.

Joining with the Sisseton Wahpeton College, the Association on American Indian Affairs produced the first rap song ever recorded in the Dakotah language in 2005. The rap song, titled "Wicozani Mitawa," or "My Life," was recorded at a studio on the Sisseton Wahpeton College campus in Sisseton, South Dakota, on the Lake Traverse Reservation. "The entire concept behind this project is to create a way to have an entire generation of young people actually hear Dakotah being used," Director of the Native Language Program for AAIA, Tammy Decoteau, said.

The program has also created a K-2 Dakotah language curriculum which all includes all of the books, CDs, games and other materials needed for implementation of the curriculum.

All of AAIA’s language materials are available for translation into other Native languages.

Sacred lands
AAIA has worked on sacred site protection for most of its history.  Its work has included efforts to protect such sites as Devils Tower and the Medicine Wheel in Wyoming, and Bear Butte in South Dakota.  In the case of the Bighorn Medicine Wheel, AAIA helped create the Medicine Wheel Coalition, a coalition of Plains Tribes who have a traditional history of using the Medicine Wheel and Medicine Mountain for spiritual purposes. With the assistance of AAIA, the Coalition negotiated and signed in 1996 a landmark Historic Preservation Plan (HPP) with the Forest Service, as well as state and local government agencies, designed to ensure that the entire area around Medicine Wheel and Medicine Mountain is managed in a manner that protects the integrity of the site as a sacred site.   It has also worked to protect the San Francisco Peaks which are sacred to more than a dozen Southwest tribes, affect national policy in regard to sacred lands, and provide legal training to tribal advocates and federal officials regarding the laws applicable to sacred lands protection.

In 2018, the Association continued this effort by filing an amicus brief ("friend of the Court" brief) with the National Congress of American Indians (NCAI) to defend the Bear Ears National Monument from efforts from the Trump Administration to diminish the land held within its borders. The lawsuit had been jointly filed the year before by the Hopi Tribe, Navajo Nation, Ute Indian Tribe, Ute Mountain Ute Tribe, and Zuni Tribe, all of whom joined together to argue that this reduction violated the Antiquities Act of 1906. The amicus brief worked to identify sites and objects within Bears Ears that were of significant cultural, historical, and spiritual importance that were not named in the original case and risk being forever lost or destroyed by this reduction.

The Association has also worked to protect a multitude of other locations Medicine Lake in California, Rainbow Bridge in Utah, Cave Rock in Nevada, Indian Pass in California, Petroglyph National Monument in New Mexico, Black Creek in New Jersey, Mount Graham in Arizona, Arctic National Wildlife Refuge [ANWR] in Alaska, and Otter Creek in Montana.

Since 2016, the Association has been highly concerned with the destruction of sacred sites along the United States-Mexico border. Among those affected are a number of sites located with the Organ Pipe Cactus National Monument. These areas are sacred to a number of Tribes, including the O’odham People. To protest the destruction of these sites, the Association provided a testimony to the United States House of Representatives Natural Resources Committee, Subcommittee for Indigenous Peoples of the United States. In this testimony, they describe the importance of sacred sites to Native American religions and the government’s role in their protection and preservation. These statements were made to juxtapose the Trump Administration’s lack of consultation with affected Tribes and its destruction of sites throughout the construction of the border wall, despite the existence of federal laws that could be used to protect these sites.

The Association works continually to affect national policy in regard to sacred lands, and to provide legal training to tribal advocates and federal officials regarding the laws applicable to sacred lands protection. It has also created and uploaded to their website a free handbook summarizing how concerned individuals can use the law to protect threatened sacred sites.

Repatriation
The Association on American Indian Affairs worked closely with Congress and other Indian advocates during the creation of the Native American Graves Protection and Repatriation Act (NAGPRA). Enacted in 1990, NAGPRA provides for the return of human remains and cultural items to indigenous peoples, including funerary objects, sacred objects and cultural patrimony.   NAGPRA contains provisions regarding the ownership of cultural resources, the repatriation of these resources to tribes and lineal descendants, and a prohibition on trafficking in these resources.  Due in large part to this Act, museums and federal agencies across the United States have inventoried and repatriated thousands of remains and objects held in their collections. AAIA has been very involved in the implementation of NAGPRA, having facilitated repatriation of almost 2,000 human remains to Dakota tribes and sacred objects to a number of tribes, as well as filing amicus briefs in NAGPRA cases, writing legal analyses of NAGPRA for public education purposes and filing comments on proposed regulations. AAIA is committed to assisting in the return of sacred ceremonial material to the appropriate American Indian nation, clan, or family, and to educating the public about the importance of repatriation.

Presently, the Association facilitates repatriation in a variety of ways. Primary among these is the facilitation of its annual Repatriation Conference. This conference brings together people from a variety of backgrounds, including individuals from Indian Country, institutions, museums, federal agencies, academics, attorneys, and many more. Sessions will focus on the future of repatriation under NAGPRA, while also analyzing how to facilitate repatriation in areas where NAGPRA does not apply.

The Association has also provided advocacy for the creation and passage several other important repatriation acts, including the National Museum of the American Indian Act, the American Indian Religious Freedom Act, the Religious Freedom Restoration Act, PROTECT Patrimony Resolution, and the Safeguard Tribal Objects of Patrimony (STOP) Act.

The National Museum of the American Indian Act of 1989 concerns the repatriation of cultural items by the Smithsonian Institution. Originally, the Act covered only human remains and funerary objects and provided for repatriation of all such items upon a showing of cultural affiliation. Amendments to the Act in 1996 modified it to extend coverage of the Museum Act to sacred objects and cultural patrimony based upon standards similar to those of NAGPRA. Yet, there are still some important inconsistencies between NAGPRA and the Museum Act that change how these two laws operate. Among these are the lack of definitions for terms such as "sacred objects" and "cultural patrimony" in the Museum Act (likely assuming the definitions of NAGPRA, though these definitions are also considered controversial) and the implementation of a requirement that tribes prove "right of possession" in order to have items repatriated. These inconsistencies often complicate the repatriation process and make it more difficult for tribes to reclaim items of significant spiritual, cultural, and/or historical importance. The Association often works to facilitate these more complex repatriations and continues to seek amendments to this legislation that will ease the repatriation process for future generations.

In addition, the Association also works with Tribes directly to provide training and technical assistance that will facilitate the repatriation of important cultural objects. In this commitment, the Association also developed the article, "A Guide to International Repatriation: Starting An Initiative in Your Community," to help Tribes and concerned individuals work to return cultural items to their rightful place, regardless of the borders between them.

References

External links
Association of American Indian Affairs Papers at the Seeley G. Mudd Manuscript Library, Princeton University
Official website

1922 establishments in New York (state)
Native American organizations
Non-profit organizations based in Maryland
Charities based in Maryland